Onur Ayık (born 28 January 1990) is a Turkish professional footballer who plays as a winger for Ümraniyespor. Born in Germany, he has represented Turkey internationally at various youth levels.

Career

Werder Bremen
Born in Walsrode, West Germany, Ayık joined Werder Bremen as a youth in 2004. Having come through the youth ranks, he intiagiily played for the club's reserves.

In February 2010, he made his first-team debut in the Bundesliga. On 24 November 2010, he made his first appearance in the UEFA Champions League for the first team against Tottenham Hotspur

Unsuccessful trials and Oberneuland
After his contract with Werder Bremen expired in summer 2012, Ayık became a free agent and had unsuccessful trials with SC Paderborn 07, Dynamo Dresden, Preußen Münster, and Halle. Having signed a pre contract with a Süper Lig club for summer 2013, he played for German fourth-tier side FC Oberneuland in the second half of the 2012–13 season.

In Turkey
In June 2013, Ayık's move to Elazığspor was announced.

On 10 May 2018, Onur helped Akhisar Belediyespor win their first professional trophy, the 2017–18 Turkish Cup.

Career statistics

Honours
Akhisarspor
 Turkish Cup: 2017–18
 Turkish Super Cup: 2018

References

External links
 
 

1990 births
Living people
People from Heidekreis
Turkish footballers
Turkey youth international footballers
German footballers
German people of Turkish descent
Association football forwards
Bundesliga players
3. Liga players
Süper Lig players
TFF First League players
SV Werder Bremen players
SV Werder Bremen II players
FC Oberneuland players
Elazığspor footballers
Kardemir Karabükspor footballers
Akhisarspor footballers
Ümraniyespor footballers
Footballers from Lower Saxony